The Australian Labor Party won the 2022 federal election, winning 77 of 151 seats in the House of Representatives. The Coalition holds 58 seats, and crossbenchers hold the remaining 16. 

Classification of seats as marginal, fairly safe or safe is applied by the independent Australian Electoral Commission using the following definition: "Where a winning party receives less than 56% of the vote, the seat is classified as 'marginal', 56–60% is classified as 'fairly safe' and more than 60% is considered 'safe'." Here, 'the vote' is defined as the vote after preferences, where the distribution of preferences has continued to the point where there are only 2 candidates left.

Pendulum
The Mackerras pendulum was devised by the Australian psephologist Malcolm Mackerras as a way of predicting the outcome of an election contested between two major parties in a Westminster style lower house legislature such as the Australian House of Representatives, which is composed of single-member electorates and which uses a preferential voting system such as a Condorcet method or instant-runoff voting.

The pendulum works by lining up all of the seats held in Parliament for the government, the opposition and the crossbenches according to the percentage point margin they are held by on a two party preferred basis. This is also known as the swing required for the seat to change hands. Given a uniform swing to the opposition or government parties, the number of seats that change hands can be predicted.

Analysis
ABC psephologist Antony Green observed that due to the considerably expanded size of the crossbench following this election, the traditional two-column format of the Mackerras pendulum had become strained, and that the crossbench deserved more attention than its position at the bottom-right of the table suggested. 

Election analyst Ben Raue observed that the use of the two-party-preferred count in the Mackerras Pendulum also had the effect of classifying several seats as safer than they really were: for example, the seat of Macnamara ended up with a 12.25% margin of victory for the Labor candidate, but if just 0.64% of voters had changed their preference to rank the Greens higher than Labor, Labor would have finished third, with the Greens winning the seat by a similarly large margin.

To overcome some of these limitations, the pollster Jim Reed produced a new Reed Pendulum after the 2022 election.   

This uses a two-candidate-preferred margin to classify each seat instead of a notional two-party preference count for the major parties, and has three arms so that contests involving minor parties and independent candidates are more clearly identified. One or two swing figures can be used to calculate seat changes along the arms.

Notes

References

Pendulums for Australian federal elections
2022 Australian federal election